"Never No More" is a song by American hip hop group Souls of Mischief recorded for their 1993 debut album 93 'til Infinity. The song was the third and final single released in promotion of the album.

Track listings
12"
"Never No More" [LP Version]
"Never No More" [Instrumental]
"Make Your Mind Up" [Rock On Mix]
"Never No More" [76 Seville Mix]
"Good Feeling"
"Never No More" [76 Seville Instrumental]

Charts

References

1994 singles
American hip hop songs
1994 songs
Jive Records singles
Song recordings produced by A-Plus (rapper)